Mirkwood is a name used for a great dark fictional forest in novels by Sir Walter Scott and William Morris in the 19th century, and by J. R. R. Tolkien in the 20th century. The critic Tom Shippey explains that the name evoked the excitement of the wildness of Europe's ancient North.

At least two distinct Middle-earth forests are named Mirkwood in Tolkien's legendarium. One is in the First Age, when the highlands of Dorthonion north of Beleriand became known as Mirkwood after falling under Morgoth's control. The more famous Mirkwood was in Wilderland, east of the river Anduin. It had acquired the name Mirkwood after it fell under the influence of the Necromancer; before that it had been known as Greenwood the Great. This Mirkwood features significantly in The Hobbit and in the film The Hobbit: The Desolation of Smaug.

The term Mirkwood derives from the forest Myrkviðr of Norse mythology; that forest has been identified by scholars as representing a wooded region of Ukraine at the time of the wars between the Goths and the Huns in the fourth century. A Mirkwood was used by the novelist Sir Walter Scott in his 1814 novel Waverley, and then by William Morris in his 1889 fantasy novel The House of the Wolfings. Forests play a major role in the invented history of Tolkien's Middle-earth and are important in the heroic quests of his characters. The forest device is used as a mysterious transition from one part of the story to another.

In Walter Scott's Waverley 

The name Mirkwood was used by Walter Scott in his 1814 novel Waverley, which had

In William Morris's fantasies 

William Morris used Mirkwood in his fantasy novels. His 1889 The Roots of the Mountains is set in such a forest, while the forest setting in his The House of the Wolfings, also first published in 1889, is actually named Mirkwood. The book begins by describing the wood:

In Tolkien's writings 

A Mirkwood appears in several places in J. R. R. Tolkien's writings, among several forests that play important roles in his storytelling. Projected into Old English, it appears as Myrcwudu in his The Lost Road, as a poem sung by Ælfwine. He used the name Mirkwood in another unfinished work, The Fall of Arthur. But the name is best known and most prominent in his Middle-earth legendarium, where it appears as two distinct forests, one in the First Age in Beleriand, as described in The Silmarillion, the other in the Third Age in Rhovanion, as described in both The Hobbit and The Lord of the Rings.

The First Age forest in Beleriand 

In The Silmarillion, the forested highlands of Dorthonion in the north of Beleriand (in the northwest of Middle-earth) eventually fell under Morgoth's control and was subjugated by creatures of Sauron, then Lord of Werewolves. Accordingly, the forest was renamed Taur-nu-Fuin in Sindarin, "Forest of Darkness", or "Forest of Nightshade"; Tolkien chose to use the English form "Mirkwood". Beren becomes the sole survivor of the men who once lived there as subjects of the Noldor King Finrod of Nargothrond. Beren ultimately escapes the terrible forest that even the Orcs fear to spend time in. Beleg pursues the captors of Túrin through this forest in the several accounts of Túrin's tale. Along with the rest of Beleriand, this forest was lost in the cataclysm of the War of Wrath at the end of the First Age.

The forest in Rhovanion 

Mirkwood is a vast temperate broadleaf and mixed forest in the Middle-earth region of Rhovanion (Wilderland), east of the great river Anduin. In The Hobbit, the wizard Gandalf calls it "the greatest forest of the Northern world." Before it was darkened by evil, it had been called Greenwood the Great.

After the publication of the maps in The Lord of the Rings, Tolkien wrote a correction stating "Mirkwood is too small on map it must be 300 miles across" from east to west, but the maps were never altered to reflect this.

The trees were large and densely packed. In the north they were mainly oaks, although beeches predominated in the areas favoured by Elves. Higher elevations in southern Mirkwood were "clad in a forest of dark fir". Pockets of the forest were dominated by dangerous giant spiders. Animals within the forest were described as inedible. The elves of the forest, too, are "black" and hostile, drawing a comparison with Svartalfheim ("Black elf home") in Snorri Sturluson's Old Norse Edda, quite unlike the friendly elves of Rivendell.

Near the end of the Third Age – the period in which The Hobbit and The Lord of the Rings are set – the expansive forest of "Greenwood the Great" was renamed "Mirkwood", supposedly a translation of an unknown Westron name. The forest plays little part in The Lord of the Rings, but is important in The Hobbit for both atmosphere and plot. It was renamed when "the shadow of Dol Guldur", namely the power of Sauron, fell upon the forest, and people began to call it Taur-nu-Fuin (Sindarin: "forest under deadly nightshade" or "forest under night", i.e. "mirk wood") and Taur-e-Ndaedelos (Sindarin: "forest of great fear").

In The Hobbit, Bilbo Baggins, with Thorin Oakenshield and his band of Dwarves, attempt to cross Mirkwood during their quest to regain their mountain Erebor and its treasure from Smaug the dragon. One of the Dwarves, the fat Bombur, falls into the Enchanted River and has to be carried, unconscious, for the following days. Losing the Elf-path, the party becomes lost in the forest and is captured by giant spiders. They escape, only to be taken prisoner by King Thranduil's Wood-Elves. The White Council flushes Sauron out of his forest tower at Dol Guldur, and as he flees to Mordor his influence in Mirkwood diminishes.

Years later, Gollum, after his release from Mordor, is captured by Aragorn and brought as a prisoner to Thranduil's realm. Out of pity, they allow him to roam the forest under close guard, but he escapes during an Orc raid. After the downfall of Sauron, Mirkwood is cleansed by the elf-queen Galadriel and renamed Eryn Lasgalen, Sindarin for "Wood of Greenleaves". Thranduil's son, Legolas, leaves Mirkwood for Ithilien. The wizard Radagast lived at Rhosgobel on the western eaves of Mirkwood, as depicted in the film The Hobbit: An Unexpected Journey.

Dol Guldur 

Dol Guldur (Sindarin: "Hill of Sorcery") was Sauron's stronghold in Mirkwood, before he moved to Barad-dûr in Mordor. It is first mentioned (as "the dungeons of the Necromancer") in The Hobbit. The hill itself, rocky and barren, was the highest point in the southwestern part of the forest. Before Sauron's occupation, it was called Amon Lanc ("Naked Hill"). It lay near the western edge of the forest, across the Anduin from Lothlórien. Tolkien suggests that Sauron settled on Dol Guldur as the focus for his rise during the period before the War of the Ring in part so that he could search for the One Ring in the Gladden Fields just up the river.

Dol Guldur has been featured in many game adaptations of The Lord of the Rings, including the Iron Crown Enterprises portrayal, which contains scenarios and adventures for the Middle-earth Role Playing game In the strategy battle game The Lord of the Rings: The Battle for Middle-earth II, Dol Guldur appears as an iconic building. The campaign-scenario called "Assault on Dol Guldur" appears as the final part of the good campaign. Several portrayals of Dol Guldur are included in the Games Workshop game The Lord of the Rings Strategy Battle Game, appearing prominently in the "Fall of the Necromancer". A number of enemies are listed, including Spider Queens, Castellans of Dol Guldur, Sauron the Necromancer, Wild Warg Chieftain, and their respective armies. Giant Bats are also included in the game.

In 1996, the black metal band Summoning released a music album named Dol Guldur.

The Canadian artist John Howe has portrayed Dol Guldur in sketches and drawings. Howe drew these for Electronic Arts. In Myth and Magic: The Art of John Howe, Howe includes Dol Guldur among Middle-earth fortresses. Howe created many drawings for Peter Jackson during the filming of the Lord of the Rings trilogy, worked for Tolkien Enterprises, and drew for Iron Crown Enterprises' collectable Middle-earth card game, which mentions Dol Guldur on Gandalf's card. Mirkwood was added to the MMORPG The Lord of the Rings Online: Shadows of Angmar in the 2009 expansion pack Siege of Mirkwood. The storyline depicts a small Elven assault upon Dol Guldur.

In Peter Jackson's 2012-2014 film trilogy adaptation of The Hobbit, Dol Guldur is depicted as a massive overgrown castle in ruins. According to Alan Lee and John Howe, the conceptual designers, this was used to give the impression that the fortress had been built by Númenóreans during the Second Age, only to fall into ruin when Númenór's power waned. Adrián Maldonado of AlmostArchaeology speculates that the derelict castle could be interpreted by viewers as the ruins of Oropher's halls, erected during the Second Age when he ruled Greenwood the Great from Amon Lanc.

Literary philology 

19th-century writers interested in philology, including the folklorist Jacob Grimm and the artist and fantasy writer William Morris, speculated romantically about the wild, primitive Northern forest, the Myrkviðr inn ókunni ("the pathless Mirkwood") and the secret roads across it, in the hope of reconstructing supposed ancient cultures. Grimm proposed that the name Myrkviðr derived from Old Norse mark (boundary) and mǫrk (forest), both, he supposed, from an older word for wood, perhaps at the dangerous and disputed boundary of the kingdoms of the Huns and the Goths.

Morris's Mirkwood is named in his 1899 fantasy novel House of the Wolfings, and a similar large dark forest is the setting in The Roots of the Mountains, again marking a dark and dangerous forest. Tolkien had access to more modern philology than Grimm, with proto-Indo-European mer- (to flicker [dimly]) and *merg- (mark, boundary), and places the early origins of both the Men of Rohan and the hobbits in his Mirkwood. The Tolkien Encyclopedia remarks also that the Old English Beowulf mentions that the path between the worlds of men and monsters, from Hrothgar's hall to Grendel's lair, runs ofer myrcan mor (across a gloomy moor) and wynleasne wudu (a joyless wood).

A Mirkwood is mentioned in multiple Norse texts including Sögubrot af nokkrum fornkonungum, Helgakviða Hundingsbana I and II, Styrbjarnar þáttr Svíakappa, and Völundarkviða; these mentions may have denoted different forests. The Goths had lived in Ukraine until the attack by the Huns in the 370s, when they moved southwest and with the permission of the Emperor Valens settled in the Roman Empire. The scholar Omeljan Pritsak identifies the Mirkwood of Hlöðskviða in Hervarar saga with what would later be called the "dark blue forest" (Goluboj lěsь) and the  "black forest" (Černyj lěsь) north of the Ukrainian steppe.

Tom Shippey noted that Norse legend yields two placenames which would place the Myrkviðr in the borderlands between the Goths and the Huns of the 4th century. The Atlakviða ("The Lay of Atli", in the Elder Edda) and the Hlöðskviða ("The Battle of the Goths and Huns", in Hervarar saga ok Heiðreks) both mention that the Mirkwood was beside the Danpar, the River Dnieper, which runs through Ukraine to the Black Sea. The Hlöðskviða states explicitly in the same passage that the Mirkwood was in Gothland. The Hervarar saga also mentions Harvaða fjöllum, "the Harvad fells", which by Grimm's Law would be *Karpat, the Carpathian Mountains, an identification on which most scholars have long agreed.

Influence 

Tolkien's estate disputed the right of the novelist Steve Hillard "to use the name and personality of J. R. R. Tolkien in the novel" Mirkwood: A Novel About J. R. R. Tolkien. The dispute was settled in May 2011, requiring the printing of a disclaimer.

A rock music group named Mirkwood was formed in 1971; their first album in 1973 had the same name. A band in California used the same name in 2005.

Tolkien's forests were the subject of a programme on BBC Radio 3, with Eleanor Rosamund Barraclough and the folk singer Mark Atherton.

Literary holidays in the Forest of Dean have been sold on the basis that the area inspired Tolkien, who often went there, to create Mirkwood and other forests in his books.

References

Primary 
This list identifies each item's location in Tolkien's writings.

Secondary

Sources 

 
 
 
 
 
 
 
 

Middle-earth forests
Forests in fiction

de:Regionen und Orte in Tolkiens Welt#Düsterwald
pl:Lista lasów Śródziemia#Mroczna Puszcza
sv:Platser i Tolkiens värld#Mörkmården